The 2015 King of the Ring was the 11th King of the Ring professional wrestling event held by WWE that featured the 20th King of the Ring tournament. Unlike previous King of the Ring events, which aired on pay-per-view (PPV) from 1993 to 2002, the 2015 event aired exclusively on WWE's livestreaming service, the WWE Network, which made it the first King of the Ring event to air on the service. The event featured the semifinals and final of the tournament. The opening round matches were held on the April 27, 2015, episode of Raw, which aired on the USA Network from the Resch Center in Green Bay, Wisconsin. The semifinals and final were then held on April 28, 2015, and aired live on the WWE Network from the iWireless Center in Moline, Illinois. It was the first tournament held since 2010 and the last to have a separate dedicated event until 2023, which was rebranded as King and Queen of the Ring.. It was also the first tournament held since the end of the first brand extension in 2011. The 2015 tournament was won by Bad News Barrett, who defeated Neville in the final and subsequently became known as King Barrett.

Background
The King of the Ring tournament is a single-elimination tournament that was established by WWE in 1985 with the winner being crowned "King of the Ring." It was held annually until 1991, with the exception of 1990. These early tournaments were held as special non-televised house shows and were held when the promotion was still called the World Wrestling Federation (WWF, renamed to WWE in 2002). In 1993, the promotion began to produce the King of the Ring tournament as a self-titled pay-per-view (PPV). Unlike the previous non-televised events, the PPV did not feature all of the tournament's matches. Instead, several of the qualifying matches preceded the event with the final few matches then taking place at the pay-per-view. There were also other matches that took place at the event as it was a traditional three-hour pay-per-view. The King of the Ring PPV was considered one of the promotion's "Big Five" PPVs, along with WrestleMania, SummerSlam, Survivor Series, and Royal Rumble.

King of the Ring continued as the annual June PPV until the 2002 event, which was the final King of the Ring produced as a PPV. Following the conclusion of the PPV chronology, the tournament began to be held periodically every few years, first making its return in 2006, which was held exclusively for wrestlers from the SmackDown! brand—the 2008 and 2010 tournaments also featured wrestlers from WWE's other brands. In April 2011, WWE ceased using its full name of World Wrestling Entertainment with "WWE" becoming an orphaned initialism. That August, the brand extension ended with both the Raw and SmackDown television shows featuring the full main roster. The 2015 tournament was the 20th King of the Ring tournament. It was held over two nights. The opening round matches were held on the April 27, 2015, episode of Raw, which aired on the USA Network from the Resch Center in Green Bay, Wisconsin. The semifinals and final were then held the following day on April 28 from the iWireless Center in Moline, Illinois and aired live on WWE's online streaming service, the WWE Network, which launched in February 2014. It was the first and so far only King of the Ring tournament to have a separate dedicated event since the final PPV in 2002, as well as the first and so far only King of the Ring event to air on the WWE Network.

Results

Quarter-finals
 Raw (Quarter-final matches) – April 27

Finals

 WWE Network event (Semi-final and final matches) – April 28

Bracket

Aftermath
In July 2016, the brand extension was reinstated, with WWE's main roster again divided between the Raw and SmackDown brands. The next King of the Ring tournament was then held in 2019 and was an interbrand tournament, featuring wrestlers from both brands. Each brand had a separate bracket, and the winners of each bracket faced off in the tournament final. Qualifying matches for the 2019 tournament began in August and took place across episodes of Raw and SmackDown. The tournament final was originally scheduled to be held at that year's Clash of Champions PPV, but was rescheduled for the following night's Raw on September 16, 2019.

The event would return to PPV and livestreaming in 2023, with that year's event rebranded as King and Queen of the Ring to incorporate the women's Queen's Crown tournament that was established in 2021.

References 

2015
2015 WWE Network events
Events in Moline, Illinois
Professional wrestling in Wisconsin
Professional wrestling in Illinois
Events in Wisconsin
Events in Illinois
2015 in Wisconsin
2015 in Illinois
April 2015 events in the United States